Ibn Al Ouardy, also known as Alwardy or Al Wardy (died 1330), was an Arab geographer, writer, and 14th-century poet. He composed a treatise on geography entitled The Pearl of Wonders.

Notes

See also 
 Ibn al-Wardi

Arab writers
1330 deaths
14th-century Arabs
Year of birth unknown
14th-century geographers